Cotyledon chrysantha (syn. Umbilicus chrysanthus Boiss.  &  Heldr.) is an ornamental plant of family Crassulaceae.

References
 

Crassulaceae